This is a list of notable video game designers, past and present, in alphabetical order.  The people in this list already have Wikipedia entries, and as such did significant design for notable computer games, console games, or arcade games. It does not include people in managerial roles (which often includes titles like "Producer" or "Development Director") or people who developed a concept without doing actual design work on the game itself (sometimes applicable to "co-creator" or "creator" roles). Just because a game is listed next to a designer's name does not imply that person was the sole designer. As with films, the credits for video games can be complicated.

A

 Allen Adham:  World of Warcraft.
 Michel Ancel: Rayman, Beyond Good & Evil.
 Chris Avellone: Fallout 2, Planescape: Torment, Icewind Dale, Fallout: New Vegas

B

 Ralph Baer: "Father of Video Games," created Chase (1967), the first game played in a television set.
 Clive Barker: Undying, Jericho.
 Richard Bartle: co-author of MUD, the first multi-user dungeon.
 Arnab Basu: Tomb Raider series and Batman: Arkham Asylum
 Chris Beatrice: Caesar, Lords of the Realm.
 Seamus Blackley: Flight Unlimited, Ultima Underworld, System Shock, and Trespasser
 Marc Blank: Zork
 Cliff Bleszinski: Gears of War, Gears of War 2, & LawBreakers 
 Jonathan Blow: Braid, The Witness.
 Ed Boon: Mortal Kombat
 Brenda Brathwaite: Wizardry 8
 Bill Budge: Raster Blaster, Pinball Construction Set
 Danielle Bunten Berry: M.U.L.E., The Seven Cities of Gold
 Eric Barone: Stardew Valley

C

 Tim Cain: Fallout, Arcanum
 Rich Carlson: Strange Adventures in Infinite Space, Weird Worlds: Return to Infinite Space
 Mark Cerny: Marble Madness, Knack
 Eric Chahi: Another World, Heart of Darkness
 Trevor Chan: Capitalism, Capitalism II, Seven Kingdoms, Seven Kingdoms II: The Fryhtan Wars, Bad Day L.A., Restaurant Empire
 Doug Church: Ultima Underworld, Ultima Underworld 2, System Shock
 Lori and Corey Cole: Quest for Glory series, Mixed-Up Fairy Tales, Castle of Dr. Brain
 Chris Crawford: Eastern Front (1941), Balance of Power
Scott Cawthon: Five Nights at Freddy's

D

 Don Daglow: Dungeon, Intellivision Utopia, Earl Weaver Baseball, Neverwinter Nights
 Patrice Désilets: Assassin's Creed.
 Dino Dini: Kick Off (video game), Kick Off 2, Player Manager, GOAL!, Dino Dini's Soccer
 Neil Druckmann: The Last of Us, The Last of Us Part II, Uncharted 2: Among Thieves, Uncharted 4: A Thief's End
 Jakub Dvorsky: Samorost, Machinarium.

F

 Josef Fares: Brothers: A Tale of Two Sons, A Way Out, It Takes Two
 Brian Fargo: Bard's Tale, Wasteland
 Steve Fawkner: Warlords, Puzzle Quest
 Steve Feak: DotA Allstars, League of Legends
 Kelton Flinn: Air Warrior
 David Fox: Zak McKracken and the Alien Mindbenders
 Toby Fox:  Undertale and Deltarune
 František Fuka: Tetris 2
 Tokuro Fujiwara: Ghosts 'n Goblins
 Rob Fulop: Demon Attack, Cosmic Ark, Night Trap

G

 Toby Gard: Tomb Raider
 Richard Garriott:Ultima
 Andy Gavin: Crash Bandicoot, Crash Bandicoot 2: Cortex Strikes Back, Crash Bandicoot: Warped, Crash Team Racing, Jak and Daxter: The Precursor Legacy, Jak II, Jak 3
 Ron Gilbert: Maniac Mansion, Monkey Island
 Julian Gollop: Chaos, Laser Squad, X-COM: UFO Defense.
 Brian Green: Meridian 59
 Stefano Gualeni: Tony Tough

H

 Dean Hall: DayZ
 Jon Hare: Sensible Soccer, Cannon Fodder, Wizball
 Stieg Hedlund: Diablo, Diablo II, StarCraft
 Amy Hennig: Uncharted: Drake's Fortune, Uncharted 2: Among Thieves, Uncharted 3: Drake's Deception, Legacy of Kain: Soul Reaver
 William Higinbotham: Tennis for Two
 Yuji Horii: Dragon Quest, Chrono Trigger
 Todd Howard: Elder Scrolls, Fallout 3
 Casey Hudson: Mass Effect 1-3, Star Wars: Knights of the Old Republic

I

 IceFrog: Defense of the Ancients, Dota 2
 Takashi Iizuka
 Tomonobu Itagaki: Dead or Alive, Ninja Gaiden, Devil's Third
 Shigesato Itoi: Mother
 Tōru Iwatani: Pac-Man, Pole Position

J
 David Jaffe: God of War, Twisted Metal
 Jennell Jaquays: leader of game design for Coleco in the 1980s, designer and level designer for Quake 2, Quake III Arena
 Eugene Jarvis: Defender, Robotron: 2084
 Jane Jensen: Gabriel Knight series, Gray Matter
 Soren Johnson: Civilization III, Civilization IV
 David Jones: Lemmings, Grand Theft Auto

K

 Josef Kates, designer of Bertie the Brain 
 Iikka Keränen, co-designer of Strange Adventures in Infinite Space, Weird Worlds: Return to Infinite Space
 Takeshi Kitano: Takeshi's Challenge
 Rieko Kodama: Phantasy Star series, Skies of Arcadia
 Hideo Kojima: Metal Gear series, Snatcher, Policenauts, and Death Stranding.
 Jarek Kolář: Vietcong.

L

 Marc Laidlaw: Half-Life, Half-Life 2
 Ken Levine: BioShock, Thief: The Dark Project
 Ken Lobb: GoldenEye 007
 Ed Logg: Asteroids, Centipede, Gauntlet
 Gilman Louie: Falcon, Super Tetris, Battle Trek
 Al Lowe: Leisure Suit Larry

M

 Gregg Mayles: Banjo-Kazooie series, Viva Piñata
 American McGee: American McGee's Alice, Doom, Quake, American McGee's Grimm
 Edmund McMillen: Gish, Aether, Coil, Spewer, The Basement Collection, Super Meat Boy, The Binding of Isaac, The Binding of Isaac: Rebirth, The End Is Nigh, The Legend of Bum-bo
 Colin McComb: Planescape: Torment, Torment: Tides of Numenera
 Brad McQuaid: EverQuest
 Jordan Mechner: Karateka, Prince of Persia
 Sid Meier: Civilization, Railroad Tycoon
 Steve Meretzky: Planetfall, The Hitchhiker's Guide to the Galaxy, A Mind Forever Voyaging, Leather Goddesses of Phobos
 Shinji Mikami: Resident Evil
 Robyn Miller, Rand Miller: Myst
 Jeff Minter: Tempest 2000, Gridrunner
 Shigeru Miyamoto: Donkey Kong, Mario, Legend of Zelda
 Hidetaka Miyazaki: Dark Souls, Bloodborne, Sekiro, Elden Ring
 Tetsuya Mizuguchi: Lumines, Rez, Space Channel 5
 Peter Molyneux: Populous, Syndicate, Black and White, Fable
 Brian Moriarty: Trinity, Loom
 David Mullich: The Prisoner, I Have No Mouth and I Must Scream

N
 Yuji Naka: Sonic the Hedgehog, Phantasy Star Online, Nights into Dreams
 Doug Neubauer: Star Raiders, Solaris
 Garry Newman: Garry's Mod, Rust
 Toshihiro Nishikado: Space Invaders, Speed Race, Gun Fight
 Tetsuya Nomura: Final Fantasy, Kingdom Hearts

O

 Yoshiki Okamoto: Street Fighter
 Scott Orr: Madden NFL

P
 Alexey Pajitnov: Tetris
 Rob Pardo: World of Warcraft, Warcraft III
 David Perry: MDK, Earthworm Jim, Wild 9, Enter the Matrix
 Markus Persson: Minecraft
 Sandy Petersen: Lightspeed, Doom, Rise of Rome
 Simon Phipps: Rick Dangerous, ShadowMan, Harry Potter and the Philosopher's Stone
 Randy Pitchford: Borderlands, Brothers in Arms, Half-Life, 
William Pugh: The Stanley Parable

R

 Rick Raymer: Clue, Scooby Doo: Mystery of the Fun Park Phantom
 Frédérick Raynal: Alone in the Dark, Little Big Adventure, Toy Commander
 Paul Reiche III: World Tour Golf, Strange Adventures in Infinite Space, Mail Order Monsters, the Star Control series, the Archon series, the Starflight series, and the Skylanders series  
 Tommy Refenes: Super Meat Boy
 Brian Reynolds: Civilization II, Sid Meier's Alpha Centauri, Rise of Nations and FrontierVille
 Chris Roberts: Wing Commander, Star Citizen
 Warren Robinett: Adventure, Rocky's Boots, & Robot Odyssey
 Scott Rogers: Maximo: Ghosts to Glory, Maximo vs. Army of Zin, God of War
 Ken Rolston: The Elder Scrolls (Morrowind and Oblivion)
 John Romero: Doom, Quake, Daikatana
 Jason Rubin: Crash Bandicoot, Crash Bandicoot 2: Cortex Strikes Back, Crash Bandicoot: Warped, Crash Team Racing, Jak and Daxter: The Precursor Legacy, Jak II, Jak 3

S

 Yoot Saito: Seaman, Odama, The Tower SP
 Hironobu Sakaguchi: Mistwalker, Final Fantasy series, Chrono Trigger
 Masahiro Sakurai: Kirby, Super Smash Bros. 
 Kevin Saunders: Torment: Tides of Numenera, Neverwinter Nights 2: Mask of the Betrayer
 Chris Sawyer: Transport Tycoon, RollerCoaster Tycoon.
 Josh Sawyer: Neverwinter Nights 2, Icewind Dale, Baldur's Gate: Dark Alliance
 Tim Schafer: Grim Fandango, Psychonauts
 Jesse Schell: Toontown Online, Pixie Hollow (video game)
 Glen Schofield: Dead Space
 Laura Shigihara: Rakuen (video game)
 Ryan Shwayder: EverQuest II
 Jeremiah Slaczka: Scribblenauts, Drawn to Life
 Doug Smith: Lode Runner
 Harvey Smith: Deux Ex, more
 Warren Spector: System Shock, Thief, Deus Ex
 Tim & Chris Stamper: Wizards & Warriors, Battletoads, Donkey Kong Country, Donkey Kong Country 2: Diddy's Kong Quest & Donkey Kong Country 3: Dixie Kong's Double Trouble! 
 Bruce Straley: Uncharted 2: Among Thieves, Uncharted 4: A Thief's End, The Last of Us
 Goichi Suda: Killer7, No More Heroes (video game)
 Yu Suzuki: Afterburner, Hang-On, Virtua Racing, Virtua Fighter, Ferrari F355 Challenge, Shenmue, Out Run
 Kim Swift: Portal
 David Sirlin: Super Street Fighter II Turbo HD Remix

T

 Satoshi Tajiri: Pokémon
 Toshiro Tsuchida: Front Mission, Arc The Lad
 John Tobias: Mortal Kombat
 Chris Taylor, Total Annihilation
 Andy Tudor: Shift 2: Unleashed
 Yoko Taro: Drakengard, Nier, Nier: Automata

U

 Fumito Ueda: Ico, Shadow of the Colossus, The Last Guardian

V

 Jon Van Caneghem: Might and Magic, Heroes of Might and Magic
 Daniel Vávra: Mafia: The City of Lost Heaven, Kingdom Come: Deliverance

W

 Robin Walker: Team Fortress
 Christopher Weaver: Gridiron!
 Jordan Weisman: BattleTech, MechWarrior
 Richard Vander Wende: Riven
 Evan Wells: Gex: Enter the Gecko, Crash Bandicoot: Warped, Crash Team Racing, Jak and Daxter: The Precursor Legacy, Jak II, Jak 3  
 Bill Williams: Necromancer, Alley Cat, Mind Walker
 Roberta Williams: King's Quest
 Tim Willits: Quake, Quake II, Quake III Arena, Quake III: Team Arena, Doom 3
 Gary Winnick: Maniac Mansion, Thimbleweed Park
 Will Wright: SimCity, The Sims, Spore

Y
 Kazunori Yamauchi: Gran Turismo
 Gunpei Yokoi: Metroid, Kid Icarus.

See also
List of video game industry people

External links
 The Giant List of Classic Game Programmers which concentrates on 8-bit era game programmers who were usually also the game's designer

Video game designers
+Designers